Babuzai is a union council located in Mardan District, Khyber Pakhtunkhwa, Pakistan. Babuazi got its name from the local Pashtun tribe Babuzai that lives there.

District Mardan has 3 Tehsils. Each Tehsil comprises certain numbers of union councils. There are 64 union councils in district Mardan.

According to Khyber Pakhtunkhwa Local Government Act 2013. Union Council Babuzai have the following 2 wards:

 VC Aba khel
 VC Bharat khel

See also 
 Mardan District
 Katlang Tehsil
 Village Babuzai (Pashtun tribe)
 Saidu Sharif 

Babuzai-Union-Councils

References

Union councils of Mardan District